Lantanopsis is a genus of Caribbean flowering plants in the family Asteraceae.

 Species
 Lantanopsis hispidula C.Wright ex Griseb. - Cuba
 Lantanopsis hoffmannii Urb. - Hispaniola
 Lantanopsis tomentosa Borhidi & Moncada - Cuba

References

Flora of the Caribbean
Asteraceae genera
Heliantheae